The women's hammer throw competition at the 2012 Summer Olympics in London, United Kingdom. The event was held at the Olympic Stadium on 8–10 August. Each athlete receives three throws in the qualifying round. All who achieve the qualifying distance progress to the final. If less than twelve athletes achieve this mark, then the twelve furthest throwing athletes reach the final. Each finalist is allowed three throws in last round, with the top eight athletes after that point being given three further attempts.

Summary
Eight entrants achieve the auto qualifier, five on their first attempt.  It took 70.48 to make the final.  Sophie Hitchon improved her own National record in the process.

In the first round of the final, reigning world champion Tatyana Lysenko was out to continue that success, tossing a new Olympic record 77.56.  In the second round Zhang Wenxiu moved into second place.  Kathrin Klaas made her best throw in the third round to move into third place, while world record holder Betty Heidler barely earned her final three throws in eighth place.  In the fifth round, Heidler finally put one throw together, landing about 77 metres.  But after a delay, the electronic measurement system only attributed 72.34 meters as the distance (actually the measurement of the following competitor Zalina Marghieva's throw).  Confused officials couldn't find a proper solution, ultimately giving the struggling Heidler another throw.  The extra throw was so bad Heidler walked out of the ring, deliberately fouling.  Anita Włodarczyk moved into second place only 44 cm behind Lysenko's record.  As the last thrower in the round, Lysenko improved the Olympic record to 78.18, solidifying her hold on gold, which turned out to be important as Włodarczyk's final throw of 77.60 beat Lysenko's first round record by 4 cm.  After the competition was over, the measurement operators found a measurement of 77.13 in the system memory and credited it to Heidler, giving her third place, knocking Zhang out of what would have been her second consecutive bronze medal.

Disqualification of Tatyana Lysenko

On 11 October 2016, IOC announced the disqualification of the gold medalist, Tatyana Lysenko, due to an anti-doping rule violation. Lysenko was ordered to return the medal and the IAAF was requested to modify the result of the event accordingly. Anita Włodarczyk is next in line to the gold medal, promoting Betty Heidler to second place and Zhang Wenxiu to third. On 30 March 2017, Gulfiya Khanafeyeva and Mariya Bespalova were also disqualified and had their results deleted.

Schedule
Entry List by Event. IAAF (2012-07-27). Retrieved on 2012-07-29.
All times are British Summer Time (UTC+1)

Records
, the existing World and Olympic records were as follows.

The following records were established during the competition:

Results

Qualifying round
40 Entrants as of 27 July 2012.

Qual. rule: qualification standard 73.00m (Q) or at least best 12 qualified (q).

Final

References

Hammer throw at the Olympics
Athletics at the 2012 Summer Olympics
2012 in women's athletics
Women's events at the 2012 Summer Olympics